Rough Night in Jericho is the second album by Athens, Georgia, rock band Dreams So Real. Their first album for Arista Records, it was released in 1988. It reached #150 on the Billboard album charts, and the title track reached #28 on the Billboard Mainstream Rock chart.

Track listing
All songs written by Barry Marler, except where noted.
 "Rough Night In Jericho"
 "Heart Of Stone"
 "Bearing Witness"
 "Victim" (Marler, Trent Allen)
 "California" (Marler, Allen)
 "City Of Love" (Marler, Allen, Drew Worsham)
 "Open Your Eyes"
 "Distance"
 "Melanie"
 "Love Fall Down"

Personnel
Barry Marler - lead vocals and guitar
Trent Allen - bass and backing vocals 
Drew Worsham - drums

References

1988 albums
Arista Records albums